Happy Camp Canyon Regional Park is a  regional park located in the eastern foothills of Moorpark, California. The park has been run by the Mountains Recreation and Conservation Authority since 1990.

Trails 

Wildlife 
The park has been known to have native wildlife from the region, including deer and mountain lions. A mountain lion sighting caused a closure of the park in 1994.

Fire history 
Happy Camp Regional Park is prone to seasonal brush fires and has burned in the Happy Camp Fire (2013), Guiberson Fire (2009), and Day Fire (2006). Portions of the park have also been used for live burn trainings by the Ventura County Fire Department.

References

External links
 

Parks in Ventura County, California
Moorpark, California